Brian McBride (born 1955) is a UK businessman, who was appointed President of the Confederation of British Industry (CBI) in June 2022.

Early Life 
Born in Glasgow on the 15 October 1955, Brian McBride grew up in a council home along with his seven siblings, his mother (a nurse) and his father (a teacher).

He attended the neighbourhood public school, Lourdes Secondary, before going on to Glasgow University where he earned a degree in Economic History and Politics.

Career 
McBride began his career in business by selling photocopiers for Xerox in Glasgow. He later worked for IBM both in the UK and in the USA, before being approached by Michael Dell, who hired him to oversee Dell's activities in the UK and Northern Europe.

McBride continued to advance his career in the digital and tech sectors, first serving as T- Mobile's managing  director and launching 3G in the UK, before joining Amazon as UK CEO, where he oversaw the company's rapid expansion in the UK market

Since leaving Amazon, McBride has held a variety of portfolio positions, including Chairman of ASOS and, most recently, Trainline. He has also served on the boards of the BBC and Abrdn (the former Standard Life Aberdeen) and is currently the lead non-executive director on the Board of the Ministry of Defence.

Also, as a Senior Adviser to Lazard's Advisory business and Senior Adviser with the Scottish Equity Partners, McBride’s involvement in the private equity and investment industry has helped make him an expert on the difficulties faced by small businesses in acquiring financing.

Brian served on as a non-executive Director on the board of Celtic FC from January 2005 - December 2009.

Confederation of British Industry (CBI) Presidency 
On 28 June 2022, McBride was chosen at the CBI’s AGM to serve as CBI President, primarily due to his experience in digital and innovation – areas that the CBI believes are key to growth in the UK.

Personal life 
McBride resides in Camberley, Surrey with his wife Linda. The couple have been married for 42 years and have two daughters 37 and 39 and four grandchildren.

In his free time, he enjoys playing golf and tennis, listens to music and spending time with his grandchildren on the weekends.

References

Further reading 
The Herald Scotland, 22 November 2022, CBI Chief Brian McBride: 'calls for action on Brexit impasse'
Sunday Times, 9 October 2022, CBI president Brian McBride: ‘We’re not at war with the Tories any more’
Sky News, 19 Feb 2022, CBI puts Trainline chairman McBride on track to be its next president
Me by Brian McBride, January 2023, University of Glasgow interview

Living people
1955 births
British business executives
People from Camberley